Orexin receptor type 2 (Ox2R or OX2), also known as  hypocretin receptor type 2 (HcrtR2), is a protein that in humans is encoded by the HCRTR2 gene.

Structure 
The structure of the receptor has been solved to 2.5 Å resolution as a fusion protein bound to suvorexant using lipid-mediated crystallization.

Function 

OX2 is a G-protein coupled receptor expressed exclusively in the brain.  It has 64% identity with OX1.  OX2 binds both orexin A and orexin B neuropeptides.  OX2 is involved in the central feedback mechanism that regulates feeding behaviour. Mice with enhanced OX2 signaling are resistant to high-fat diet-induced obesity.

This receptor is activated by Hipocretin, which is a wake-promoting hypothalamic neuropeptide that acts as a critical regulator of sleep in animals as Zebrafish or Mammals. This protein has mutations in Astyanax mexicanus that reduces the sleep needs of the cavefish.

Ligands

Agonists
 Danavorexton (TAK-925) – selective OX2 receptor agonist
 Firazorexton  – selective OX2 receptor agonist
 Orexins – dual OX1 and OX2 receptor agonists
 Orexin-A – approximately equipotent at the OX1 and OX2 receptors
 Orexin-B – approximately 5- to 10-fold selectivity for the OX2 receptor over the OX1 receptor
 SB-668875 – selective OX2 receptor agonist
 Suntinorexton  – selective OX2 receptor agonist
 TAK-861 – selective OX2 receptor agonist
 TAK-994 – selective OX2 receptor agonist

Antagonists
 Almorexant - Dual OX1 and OX2 antagonist
 Daridorexant (nemorexant) - Dual OX1 and OX2 antagonist
 EMPA - Selective OX2 antagonist
 Filorexant - Dual OX1 and OX2 antagonist
 JNJ-10397049 (600x selective for OX2 over OX1)
 Lemborexant - Dual OX1 and OX2 antagonist
 MK-1064 - Selective OX2 antagonist
 MK-8133 - Selective OX2 antagonist
 SB-649,868 - Dual OX1 and OX2 antagonist
 Seltorexant - Selective OX2 antagonist
 Suvorexant - Dual OX1 and OX2 antagonist
 TCS-OX2-29 - Selective OX2 antagonist
 (3,4-dimethoxyphenoxy)alkylamino acetamides
 Compound 1m - Selective OX2 antagonist

See also 
 Orexin receptor

References

Further reading 

 
 
 
 
 
 
 
 
 
 
 
 
 
 
 
 

G protein-coupled receptors